Retrato de un médico (or Portrait of a Doctor) is an oil painting by the El Greco.

Painted in Toledo between 1582 and 1585, and on display at the Museo del Prado, some authors suggest the portrait of the anonymous doctor (as defined by his thumb ring) may either be that of Luis de Mercado, Felipe II's chamber doctor, or of Rodrigo de la Fuente, a friend of El Greco.

References

Doctor
Doctor
1580s paintings
Doctor
Doctor
Paintings by El Greco in the Museo del Prado